Robert Frost Farm may refer to:

Robert Frost Farm (Derry, New Hampshire), a U.S. National Historic Landmark listed on the National Register of Historic Places in New Hampshire
Robert Frost Farm (Ripton, Vermont), a U.S. National Historic Landmark listed on the National Register of Historic Places in Addison County, Vermont
Robert Frost Farm (South Shaftsbury, Vermont), listed on the National Register of Historic Places in Bennington County, Vermont

See also
Frost Farm (disambiguation)